Los artistas: primeros trazos is an upcoming Mexican comedy drama streaming television series created by María Dueñas. The series is produced by 360 Powwow and Isla Audiovisual. The series will star Maxi Iglesias and Ximena Romo. It will premiere on Vix+.

Premise 
Yago (Maxi Iglesias), an antique dealer, and Cata (Ximena Romo), an art expert, decide to take advantage of their skills and knowledge to swindle millionaires by selling them false works of art, in order to get out of their difficult circumstances.

Cast 
 Maxi Iglesias as Yago
 Ximena Romo as Cata
 Francesc Garrido

Production 
On 16 February 2022, the series was announced as one of the titles for TelevisaUnivision's streaming platform Vix+. On 8 September 2022, Maxi Iglesias and Ximena Romo were announced in the lead roles, with filming beginning in Madrid, Spain a few days later. Filming also took place in Toledo, Marbella and Miami. Filming concluded in January 2023. On 15 February 2023, Vix released the first teaser for the series.

References

External links 
 

Upcoming television series
Vix (streaming service) original programming